MC3T3 is an osteoblast precursor cell line derived from Mus musculus (mouse) calvaria. 

A number of derivatives of this strain have been isolated to select for varying degrees of osteogenic potential, and have been widely used as model systems in bone biology. A standard textbook calls its MC3T3-E1 sub-line "one of the most convenient and physiologically relevant systems for study of transcriptional control in calvarial osteoblasts." This is a spontaneously transformed ( immortalized ) cell line. As such, it is a very convenient research tool but caution should be used when extrapolating these results to normal cells, and even more, to normal human cells. 

The MC3T3 cell line is also used for modeling skeletal tissue regeneration because its undifferentiated state is phenotypically similar to that of an osteochondroprogenitor cell. One published research article, using MC3T3-E1 cells as a model for studying cartilage regeneration, describes some of the specific  limitations of the cell line for understanding behavior in human cells.

References

External links
Cellosaurus entry for MC3T3
Cellosaurus entry for MC3T3-E1

Rodent cell lines
Osteology